SMS Deutschland may refer to one of the following ships in the German Empire's Kaiserliche Marine:

 , an armored frigate commissioned in 1875
 , a battleship launched in 1904
 , an auxiliary mine layer commissioned in 1914

See also
 Deutschland (disambiguation)
 

German Navy ship names